Alejo Germán Tabares (born 20 June 2001) is an Argentine professional footballer who plays as a left-back for Estudiantes RC.

Club career
Tabares started out in the youth ranks at Cimac, which preceded a move to Deportivo Roca. In 2018, Tabares headed to Lanús. He made the breakthrough into their first-team squad towards the end of 2020, scoring in a friendly against Arsenal de Sarandí before appearing as an unused substitute for defeats to Boca Juniors and São Paulo in early November. Later that month, on 25 November, Tabares made his senior debut in a Copa Sudamericana round of sixteen, first leg defeat to Bolívar; replacing José Sand with minutes remaining at the Estadio Hernando Siles.

On 28 January 2022, Tabares joined Primera Nacional club Estudiantes de Río Cuarto.

International career
Tabares represented Argentina's U18s at the 2019 COTIF Tournament in Spain.

Career statistics
.

Notes

References

External links

2001 births
Living people
People from General Roca
Argentine footballers
Argentina youth international footballers
Association football defenders
Club Atlético Lanús footballers
Estudiantes de Río Cuarto footballers